"Myzsterious Mizster Jones" is a song by the British rock band Slade, released in 1985 as the third single from the band's twelfth studio album Rogues Gallery. The song was written by lead vocalist Noddy Holder and bassist Jim Lea, and produced by John Punter. It reached No. 50 in the UK, remaining in the charts for five weeks.

Background
Slade began recording Rogues Gallery in 1984, with the first single, "All Join Hands", reaching the UK Top 20 in late 1984. The following single, "7 Year Bitch", stalled at No. 60 after it was banned by a number of UK broadcasters. In the hope of recovering from the "backlash", "Myzsterious Mizster Jones" was released as the album's third single in March 1985, two weeks prior to the release of the album. It peaked at No. 50 in the UK.

In a 1985 interview on Australian TV, Holder spoke of the song's titular character: "It's about a friend of mine from Wolverhampton who used to be a Hell's Angel actually, but I changed his name to protect the innocent 'cause I don't think he'd like a song about him. It's not knocking him, you know, but it's a song about him." In a 1986 fan club interview, Lea revealed that he had come up with the song's melody while holding a conservation with his brother in a pub.

Release
"Myzsterious Mizster Jones" was released on 7" and 12" vinyl by RCA Records in the UK, France, Germany, the Netherlands, New Zealand and Australia. The B-side, "Mama Nature Is a Rocker", was exclusive to the single and would later appear on the band's 2007 compilation B-Sides. On the 12" single, an extended version of "Myzsterious Mizster Jones" was featured as the A-side, and a second B-side, "My Oh My (Piano & Vocal)" was also included; a demo-like version of the band's 1983 hit "My Oh My". On the single, it was labelled as a "Special Collectors Edition" of the song.

The single came with a full-colour picture sleeve featuring photography by Alan Ballard. In the UK, a limited edition 7" vinyl picture disc was also released in addition to the standard version. In France, the song was released as a promotional single only, with "All Join Hands" as the B-Side.

Promotion
A music video was filmed to promote the single, which was directed by Phillip Davey. Described in 1986 as Lea's personal favourite of all Slade videos, it depicted the band as gangsters in a warehouse while the production of prohibition whiskey is shown in other shots. The video debuted on Sky Tracks, with Holder describing the video as "fabulous".

In the UK, the band mimed the song on the BBC children's television show Saturday Superstore. In Europe, the song was mimed on the German TV shows ExtraTour and Die Spielbude.

Critical reception
Upon release, Marshall O'Leary for Smash Hits reviewed the single, writing: "I've never been a great lover of Slade's "orl-ta-geth-ah nah" heavy metal style. However, I found myself humming along to it. Not as good as "My Oh My" but one of their classiest singles yet." In a review of Rogues Gallery, Sounds said the song was "almost a throwback to the halcyon daze of "Coz I Luv You"..." The Canadian newspaper Leader-Post said the song displayed the bands "keen melody and a healthy dollop of humour". Sean Carruthers of AllMusic retrospectively chose the song as an AMG Pick Track in his review of Rogues Gallery, as did Dave Thompson of AllMusic from the 2006 box-set The Slade Box.

Formats
7" Single
"Myzsterious Mizster Jones" - 3:37
"Mama Nature is a Rocker" - 2:52

7" Picture Disc Single
"Myzsterious Mizster Jones" - 3:37
"Mama Nature is a Rocker" - 2:52

12" Single
"Myzsterious Mizster Jones (Extended Version)" - 4:47
"Mama Nature is a Rocker" - 2:52
"My Oh My (Piano & Vocal Version)" - 3:11

7" Single (French Jukebox release)
"Myzsterious Mizster Jones" - 3:37
"All Join Hands" - 4:16

Chart performance

Personnel
Slade
Noddy Holder - lead vocals
Jim Lea - bass, synthesiser, backing vocals, producer of "Mama Nature Is a Rocker" and "My Oh My (Piano & Vocal)", arranger
Dave Hill - lead guitar, backing vocals
Don Powell - drums

Additional personnel
John Punter - producer of "Myzsterious Mizster Jones"
Green Ink - design
Alan Ballard - photography

References

1985 singles
1985 songs
Slade songs
RCA Records singles
Songs written by Noddy Holder
Songs written by Jim Lea
Electronic rock songs
Song recordings produced by John Punter